Ezra Frech (born 11 May 2005) is an American Paralympic athlete who competes in high jump, long jump and sprinting events in international level events. He is a double silver Parapan American Games medalist and is also a motivational speaker and disability rights advocate.

Personal life
Frech is the eldest of three sons of actress Bahar Soomekh and Clayton Frech. His mother is a Persian Jewish immigrant, and his father converted to Judaism. He was born without most of his left leg (missing a knee and fibula) and missing fingers on his left hand. When he was two years old, Frech had surgery to remove his lower left leg and transplanted a toe from his amputated foot onto his left hand at Boston Children's Hospital. He received a prosthetic leg when he was eleven months old.

He was a 2014 finalist for Sports Illustrated Sportkid of the Year.

Motivational speaker
In 2006, Frech and his family founded Team Ezra to provide financial resources to organizations that serve people with physical disabilities. And in 2013, Frech and his father, Clayton Frech, founded Angel City Sports to provide free, year-round access to sport training, equipment, and competitive opportunities for kids and adults with physical disabilities.  Angel City Sports is one of the fastest growing adaptive sports programs in the country and hosts one of the largest events in the country, the Angel City Games presented by The Hartford.

He is also a motivational speaker and started speaking to schools at the age of four to raise awareness for people with impairments as part of his organisation's project.

Sporting career
Frech has played basketball, baseball, soccer and karate before focusing on track and field athletics in 2013.
His first athletics meet was the Endeavor Games in Edmund, Oklahoma.  In Oklahoma as an 8 year old Frech broke a few national youth records and was inspired to continue in T&F.  His father was also inspired at the Endeavor Games with a vision to create a similar event in Los Angeles, to be named the Angel City Games (and ultimately sponsored by The Hartford).

His first international meet was at the 2019 World Para Athletics Junior Championships where he won one gold and two bronze medals, he participated in his second international meet at the 2019 Parapan American Games where he won two silver medals, he also took part in the 2019 World Para Athletics Championships in Dubai but did not medal. He was, however, the youngest athlete in the world to compete at the 2019 World Championships and made the finals in all three of his events.

At the 2020 Summer Paralympics Frech ranked 5th in the high jump event with a personal best of 1.80 m and 8th in the long jump event with 5.85 m.

References

2005 births
Living people
Track and field athletes from Los Angeles
Paralympic track and field athletes of the United States
American male long jumpers
American male high jumpers
American male sprinters
American people of Iranian-Jewish descent
Jewish American sportspeople
Medalists at the 2019 Parapan American Games
Athletes (track and field) at the 2020 Summer Paralympics
21st-century American Jews